"Jaimme's Got a Gal" is the third single from the album Sound as Ever by Australian rock band You Am I. It was released in 1994 and peaked at number 93 on the Australian ARIA singles chart in June 1994. The song also reached #77 in that year's Hottest 100. The Jaimme of the title is Jaimme Rogers, the brother of You Am I's frontman and chief songwriter Tim Rogers, who had been a founding member of the band but left it within twelve months of its formation. "Jaimme's Got a Gal" thus partly explains the reason for his departure.

Track listing
 "Jaimme's Got a Gal" – 3:29
 "I'm So Tired" – 2:13
 "20,000" – 1:42

All songs by Tim Rogers, except 2 (Lennon–McCartney)

"I'm So Tired" is a cover of the Beatles song. "20,000" is a You Am I original, and the name of the single parodies Aerosmith's song "Janie's Got a Gun".

Alternative versions
"Jaimme (Makers Mark Version)" is an acoustic version of "Jaimme's Got a Gal" which was released as a B-side on the "Berlin Chair" single. On the US release of Sound as Ever "Jaimme's Got a Gal" was one of the four tracks remixed by David Bianco.

Charts

References

1994 singles
You Am I songs
Songs written by Tim Rogers (musician)
1993 songs
Songs written by Andy Kent
Songs written by Mark Tunaley